The redspot barb (Enteromius kerstenii) is a species of freshwater cyprinid fish found in East Africa.  It is named for the large, orange-red spot found on each operculum.

According to FishBase, the South African Enteromius tangandensis (also referred to as "redsport barb") is a synonym of E. kerstenii, whereas the Catalog of Fishes lists them as separate species.

The fish is named in honor of Otto Kersten (1839-1900), an early explorer of Mount Kilimanjaro, who sent a small collection of fishes to Peters, including the type specimen of this species.

Footnotes 

 
 Eschmeyer, W. (2014) Barbus tangandensis CAS, Catalog of Fishes

Enteromius
Cyprinid fish of Africa
Fish described in 1868
Taxa named by Wilhelm Peters